Maccabi Tamra is an Israeli football club based in Tamra. The club currently plays in Liga Alef North division.

History
The club was founded in 1965 and played in the lower divisions of Israeli football until the 1980s, when the club enjoyed a period of success, after they won Liga Bet North A division in the 1983–84 season, and were promoted to Liga Alef, and later, won Liga Alef North in the 1987–88 season, and made historic promotion to Liga Artzit, the second tier of Israeli football at the time.

In 1988–89, their debut season in Liga Artzit, the club finished in the 10th place out of 14. However, in the following season, they finished third bottom (14th out of 16), and dropped back to Liga Alef, after losing 0–1 after extra time to Ironi Ashdod in the Promotion-relegation play-off match.

During their spell in Liga Artzit, the club was managed by Eli Guttman, who would later become manager of Hapoel Tel Aviv and the Israeli national team.

The club was last relegated from Liga Alef at the end of the 2011–12 season, after second bottom finish in Liga Alef North. at the end of the 2013–14 season, they were relegated to Liga Gimel, the fifth and lowest tier of Israeli football, after losing the Liga Bet North A relegation play-offs against Hapoel Bnei Maghar and Hapoel Sakhnin.

Honours
Liga Alef North:
1987–88
Liga Bet North A:
1983–84, 1992–93, 2018–19
Liga Gimel Bay Area:
1980–81, 2017–18

External links
Maccabi Ironi Tamra The Israel Football Association

References

Tamra
Tamra
Association football clubs established in 1965
1965 establishments in Israel
Arab-Israeli football clubs